In mathematics, the inverse limit (also called the projective limit) is a construction that allows one to "glue together" several related objects, the precise gluing process being specified by morphisms between the objects. Thus, inverse limits can be defined in any category although their existence depends on the category that is considered. They are a special case of the concept of limit in category theory. 

By working in the dual category, that is by reverting the arrows, an inverse limit becomes a direct limit or inductive limit, and a limit becomes a colimit.

Formal definition

Algebraic objects 

We start with the definition of an inverse system (or projective system) of groups and homomorphisms. Let  be a directed poset (not all authors require I to be directed). Let (Ai)i∈I be a family of groups and suppose we have a family of homomorphisms  for all  (note the order) with the following properties:
 

We define the inverse limit of the inverse system  as a particular subgroup of the direct product of the 's:

The inverse limit and the natural projections satisfy a universal property described in the next section.

This same construction may be carried out if the 's are sets, semigroups, topological spaces, rings, modules (over a fixed ring), algebras (over a fixed ring), etc., and the homomorphisms are morphisms in the corresponding category. The inverse limit will also belong to that category.

General definition 

The inverse limit can be defined abstractly in an arbitrary category by means of a universal property. Let  be an inverse system of objects and morphisms  in a category C (same definition as above). The inverse limit of this system is an object X in C together with morphisms i: X → Xi (called projections) satisfying i =  ∘ j for all i ≤ j. The pair (X, i)  must be universal in the sense that for any other such pair (Y, ψi) there exists a unique morphism u: Y → X such that the diagram

commutes for all i ≤ j. The inverse limit is often denoted

with the inverse system  being understood.

In some categories, the inverse limit of certain inverse systems does not exist. If it does, however, it is unique in a strong sense: given any two inverse limits X and X of an inverse system, there exists a unique isomorphism X′ → X commuting with the projection maps.

Inverse systems and inverse limits in a category C admit an alternative description in terms of functors. Any partially ordered set I can be considered as a small category where the morphisms consist of arrows i → j if and only if i ≤ j. An inverse system is then just a contravariant functor I → C. Let  be the category of these functors (with natural transformations as morphisms). An object X of C can be considered a trivial inverse system, where all objects are equal to X and all arrow are the identity of X. This defines a "trivial functor" from C to  The inverse limit, if it exists, is defined as a right adjoint of this trivial functor.

 Examples 
 The ring of p-adic integers is the inverse limit of the rings  (see modular arithmetic) with the index set being the natural numbers with the usual order, and the morphisms being "take remainder". That is, one considers sequences of integers  such that each element of the sequence "projects" down to the previous ones, namely, that  whenever  The natural topology on the p-adic integers is the one implied here, namely the product topology with cylinder sets as the open sets.
 The p-adic solenoid is the inverse limit of the topological groups  with the index set being the natural numbers with the usual order, and the morphisms being "take remainder".
In particular, when , this gives the ring of p-adic integers.
 Pro-finite groups are defined as inverse limits of (discrete) finite groups.
 Let the index set I of an inverse system (Xi) have a greatest element m. Then the natural projection m: X → Xm is an isomorphism.
 In the category of sets, every inverse system has an inverse limit, which can be constructed in an elementary manner as a subset of the product of the sets forming the inverse system. The inverse limit of any inverse system of non-empty finite sets is non-empty. This is a generalization of Kőnig's lemma in graph theory and may be proved with Tychonoff's theorem, viewing the finite sets as compact discrete spaces, and then applying the finite intersection property characterization of compactness.
 In the category of topological spaces, every inverse system has an inverse limit. It is constructed by placing the initial topology on the underlying set-theoretic inverse limit.  This is known as the limit topology.
 The set of infinite strings is the inverse limit of the set of finite strings, and is thus endowed with the limit topology. As the original spaces are discrete, the limit space is totally disconnected. This is one way of realizing the p-adic numbers and the Cantor set (as infinite strings).

Derived functors of the inverse limit

For an abelian category C, the inverse limit functor

is left exact. Specifically, Eilenberg constructed a functor

(pronounced "lim one") such that if (Ai, fij), (Bi, gij), and (Ci, hij) are three inverse systems of abelian groups, and

is a short exact sequence of inverse systems, then

is an exact sequence in Ab.

Mittag-Leffler condition

If the ranges of the morphisms of an inverse system of abelian groups (Ai, fij) are stationary, that is, for every k there exists j ≥ k such that for all i ≥ j : one says that the system satisfies the Mittag-Leffler condition.

The name "Mittag-Leffler" for this condition was given by Bourbaki in their chapter on uniform structures for a similar result about inverse limits of complete Hausdorff uniform spaces. Mittag-Leffler used a similar argument in the proof of Mittag-Leffler's theorem.

The following situations are examples where the Mittag-Leffler condition is satisfied: 
 a system in which the morphisms fij are surjective
 a system of finite-dimensional vector spaces or finite abelian groups or modules of finite length or Artinian modules.

An example where  is non-zero is obtained by taking I to be the non-negative integers, letting Ai = piZ, Bi = Z, and Ci = Bi / Ai = Z/piZ. Then

where Zp denotes the p-adic integers.

Further results

More generally, if C is an arbitrary abelian category that has enough injectives, then so does CI, and the right derived functors of the inverse limit functor can thus be defined. The nth right derived functor is denoted

In the case where C satisfies Grothendieck's axiom (AB4*), Jan-Erik Roos generalized the functor lim1 on Ab'''I to series of functors limn such that

It was thought for almost 40 years that Roos had proved (in Sur les foncteurs dérivés de lim. Applications. ) that lim1 Ai = 0 for (Ai, fij) an inverse system with surjective transition morphisms and I the set of non-negative integers (such inverse systems are often called "Mittag-Leffler sequences"). However, in 2002, Amnon Neeman and Pierre Deligne constructed an example of such a system in a category satisfying (AB4) (in addition to (AB4*)) with lim1 Ai ≠ 0. Roos has since shown (in "Derived functors of inverse limits revisited") that his result is correct if C has a set of generators (in addition to satisfying (AB3) and (AB4*)).

Barry Mitchell has shown (in "The cohomological dimension of a directed set") that if I has cardinality  (the dth infinite cardinal), then Rnlim is zero for all n ≥ d + 2. This applies to the I-indexed diagrams in the category of R-modules, with R a commutative ring; it is not necessarily true in an arbitrary abelian category (see Roos' "Derived functors of inverse limits revisited" for examples of abelian categories in which limn, on diagrams indexed by a countable set, is nonzero for n'' > 1).

Related concepts and generalizations 

The categorical dual of an inverse limit is a direct limit (or inductive limit). More general concepts are the limits and colimits of category theory. The terminology is somewhat confusing: inverse limits are a class of limits, while direct limits are a class of colimits.

Notes

References

 Section 3.5 of 

Limits (category theory)
Abstract algebra

de:Limes (Kategorientheorie)